Prospalta was a deme of ancient Attica in the phyle Acamantis. It lay in the interior, between Zoster and Potamus.

Its site is located northwest of modern Kalyvia Thorikou.

References

Populated places in ancient Attica
Former populated places in Greece
Demoi